Lumir Abdixhiku (born 22 April 1983) is a Kosovar Albanian politician serving as President of Democratic League of Kosovo since 14 March 2021. He previously served as Minister of Infrastructure and Environment in the 2019. He was also a Chairman of the Budget and Finance Committee in the Assembly of the Republic of Kosovo from 2017 to 2019.

Early life and education 

Abdixhiku was born on 22 April 1983, in Prishtina, Republic of Kosovo. Lumir Abdixhiku finished elementary school from “Gjergj Fishta” and high school from “Xhevdet Doda”. After graduating from high school, he started his BA studies in the Faculty of Law and Economics at the University of Prishtina, graduating in 2004. Abdixhiku continued his postgraduate studies in Great Britain, receiving a MSc in Economics for Business Analysis in 2006 and a PhD in 2013 from Staffordshire University. He received his PhD after four years of research in the field of ‘Determinants of Business Tax Evasion in Transition Economies’.

Personal life 

Lumir Abdixhiku is married and he has two daughters. Lumir Abdixhiku has served as Executive Director of Riinvest Institute, one of oldest and most prestigious research institutes and think-tanks in Kosovo. He held this position from 2010 to 2017, when he resigned following his entry to politics. As head of this institute, Mr. Abdixhiku oversaw the implementation of various projects in Kosovo. Mr. Abdixhiku has been a Lecturer at Riinvest College since 2007 where he has taught a range of courses in the field of economics.

Lumir Abdixhiku has been a weekly columnist in Koha Ditore from 2011 to 2017. Writing under the banner “Letters from limbo”, he has covered a broad range of issues that preoccupied Kosovan society in the aftermath of the declaration of independence, mainly criticizing what he considered rampant corruption, nepotism, gerrymandering, deep state, etc.

Leader of LDK 
For three consecutive elections, Lumir Abdixhiku was one of the most voted candidates for the Assembly of Kosovo. In 2020 he was nominated as Minister of Infrastructure and Transport. He also was a member of the Presidency of LDK.

Following LDK’s defeat in general elections, party leader Isa Mustafa resigned and opened the way for new leadership. In the party elections held on 14 March 2021, Lumir Abdixhiku secured 191 votes out of 328 in total, becoming a new party leader. As a leader of LDK, Lumir Abdixhiku has undertaken several reforms and has embraced a conciliatory tone that would help his party reach favorable results in the municipal elections held in 2021.

Municipal elections 
In the latest municipal elections, held in October and November (runoff), LDK won in Peja and Lipjan in the first round, while flipping the capital city Prishtina in the runoff and holding Fushe Kosova, Vitia, Istog, Junik and Dragash. In the first round, the popular vote of LDK was 170.177, with 205 assembly members. LDK was ranked as the first party based on general vote.

References 

Democratic League of Kosovo politicians
People from Pristina
1983 births
Living people
Environment ministers of Kosovo
Infrastructure ministers of Kosovo